The 52nd National Film Awards, presented by Directorate of Film Festivals, the organisation set up by Ministry of Information and Broadcasting, India to felicitate the best of Indian Cinema released in the year 2004.

The selection process of 52nd National Film Awards began with the constitution of three Juries for feature film, non-feature film and best writing on cinema sections. The renowned filmmaker Sudhir Mishra headed the feature film Jury, which had sixteen other members. Cinematographer and Director A. K. Bir headed the seven-member non-feature film Jury. The Jury for best writing on cinema was headed by veteran film critic and former editor of Screen and Filmfare from Mumbai, Rauf Ahmed.

Awards were announced by each committee chairpersons on 13 July 2005. Award ceremony took place at Vigyan Bhavan, New Delhi on 21 October 2005 and awards were given by then President of India, Dr. A. P. J. Abdul Kalam.

For 52nd National Film Awards, 107 feature films participated along with 118 non-feature films and 22 books on cinema in 9 Indian languages.

Awards 

Awards were divided into feature films, non-feature films and books written on Indian cinema.

Lifetime Achievement Award

Feature films 

Feature films were awarded at All India as well as regional level. For 52nd National Film Awards, a Hindi film, Page 3 won the National Film Award for Best Feature Film also winning the maximum number of awards (3), along with a Tamil film, Autograph. Following were the awards given in each category:

Juries 

A committee headed by Sudhir Mishra was appointed to evaluate the feature films awards. Following were the jury members:

 Jury Members
 Sudhir Mishra (Chairperson)Preeti SagarVanisriSatabdi RoyL. VaidyanathanSandeep SawantSubhadro ChaudhuryChandi Mukherjee
 Sharad DuttBhajan SoporiT. S. NagabharanaNagesh KukunoorRanjeet DasM. SanjeevM. MohanVinod GanatraVasantha S. M. A.

All India Award 

Following were the awards given:

Golden Lotus Award 

Official Name: Swarna Kamal

All the awardees are awarded with 'Golden Lotus Award (Swarna Kamal)', a certificate and cash prize.

Silver Lotus Award 

Official Name: Rajat Kamal

All the awardees are awarded with 'Silver Lotus Award (Rajat Kamal)', a certificate and cash prize.

Regional Awards 

The award is given to best film in the regional languages in India.

Best Feature Film in Each of the Language Other Than Those Specified in the Schedule VIII of the Constitution

Non-Feature Films 

Short Films made in any Indian language and certified by the Central Board of Film Certification as a documentary/newsreel/fiction are eligible for non-feature film section.

Juries 

A committee headed by A. K. Bir was appointed to evaluate the non-feature films awards. Following were the jury members:

 Jury Members
 A. K. Bir (Chairperson)Kadambari ChintamaniVasiraju PrakasamSudhish GopalakrishnanSupriyo SenPrasann Jain Pushpesh Pant

Golden Lotus Award 

Official Name: Swarna Kamal

All the awardees are awarded with 'Golden Lotus Award (Swarna Kamal)', a certificate and cash prize.

Silver Lotus Award 

Official Name: Rajat Kamal

All the awardees are awarded with 'Silver Lotus Award (Rajat Kamal)' and cash prize.

Best Writing on Cinema 

The awards aim at encouraging study and appreciation of cinema as an art form and dissemination of information and critical appreciation of this art-form through publication of books, articles, reviews etc.

Juries 

A committee headed by Rauf Ahmed was appointed to evaluate the writing on Indian cinema. Following were the jury members:

 Jury Members
 Rauf Ahmed (Chairperson)Utpal BorpujariShoma A. Chatterji

Golden Lotus Award 
Official Name: Swarna Kamal

All the awardees are awarded with 'Golden Lotus Award (Swarna Kamal)' and cash prize.

Awards not given 

Following were the awards not given as no film was found to be suitable for the award:

 Best Feature Film in Manipuri
 Best Feature Film in Oriya
 Best Historical Reconstruction / Compilation Film
 Best Arts / Cultural Film
 Best Educational / Motivational / Instructional Film
 Best Promotional Film
 Best Agricultural Film

References

External links 
 National Film Awards Archives
 Official Page for Directorate of Film Festivals, India

National Film Awards (India) ceremonies
2005 Indian film awards